Ljuta, also called Dindolka, is one of the main tributaries of the first section of the Neretva river, also called Upper Neretva. It meets Neretva from the right, flowing from north to south, between Treskavica and Visočica mountains.

Geography
The Ljuta river begins as Srednja Voda creek from "Baletina Voda" spring that emerges in the areal above Ljuta village, under the northwestern ridge of Treskavica mountain, and after a short run, cca. 5 kilometers, it joins with the Bijela Vodica and Božija Vodica creeks where it become the Ljuta.
The Ljuta river forms a cca 30km long valley squeezed between Treskavica and Visočica, southeast from Sarajevo.

Protection
Bosnia and Herzegovina on several occasions, since 1998, was preparing to establish a large national park which, according to developed but never operationalized plans, would comprise the entire region of Gornja Neretva, including region between the Rakitnica and the Ljuta rivers.

See also
 Mostarska Bijela
 Rakitnica
 Dindo, Konjic
 Glavatičevo
 Konjic
 List of national parks of BiH
 Environmental impacts of dams
 Environment and electricity generation

External links
 ZELENI-NERETVA Konjic NGO For Preservation Of The Neretva River And Environment Protection
 Declaration For The Protection Of The Neretva River for download - Declaration Initiator, ZELENI-NERETVA Konjic NGO For Preservation Of The Neretva River And Environment Protection
 WWF Panda - Living Neretva
 Balkan Trout Restoration Group Site
 Center of expertise on hydropower impacts on fish and fish habitat, Canada
 International Rivers
 Interactive site that demonstrates dams' effects on rivers
 Neretva.org Open Project
 Ambasada Neretva Rafting

References

Rivers of Bosnia and Herzegovina
Tourist attractions in Bosnia and Herzegovina
Protected areas of Bosnia and Herzegovina
Nature conservation in Bosnia and Herzegovina
Environment of Bosnia and Herzegovina
Canyons and gorges of Bosnia and Herzegovina
Upper Neretva
Tributaries of the Neretva